Rhona Brown (September 23, 1922 - March 14, 2014),  was a South African botanical artist and housewife.

Brown was educated at University of Natal in Pietermaritzburg and UNISA graduating with a B.A.(Hons.) in Fine Arts and with a National Art Teachers Certificate. She worked at the Botanical Research Institute in Pretoria for two spells - 1944-46 and 1965–69 and taught sporadically for eight years. She completed some 100 plates for the Flowering Plants of Africa and black-and-white illustrations for Bothalia and Flora of Southern Africa. She provided about half of all illustrations for Palmer & Pitman's Trees of Southern Africa and all the illustrations for Eve Palmer's Field Guide to the Trees of Southern Africa.

She married Comdt. H.T. Collett on 2 March 1946.

Publications
1972 Trees of Southern Africa by Eve Palmer & Norah Pitman, illustrated By Rhona Collett (3 vols.) 	
1977 A Field Guide to the Trees of Southern Africa by Eve Palmer, illustrated By Rhona Collett (William Collins & Sons Ltd.)  
Calligraphy Teachers Manual - Rhona Collett et al.

References

1922 births
2014 deaths
20th-century South African women artists
21st-century South African women artists
University of Natal alumni
University of South Africa alumni
Botanical illustrators
South African painters